Bambaia is a village in the Oio Region of northern Guinea-Bissau. It is located west of Casa Nova and northeast of Mansaba.

References

External links
Maplandia World Gazetteer

Populated places in Guinea-Bissau
Oio Region